The following highways are numbered 865:

Canada

United States